Amphitalhamus is a genus of minute sea snails, marine gastropod mollusks or micromollusks in the family Anabathridae.

Species
Species within the genus Amphithalamus include:
 Amphithalamus albus Rolán, 1991
 Amphithalamus alphesboei Melvill, 1912
 Amphithalamus elspethae Melvill, 1910
 Amphithalamus erosus (Odhner, 1924)
 Amphithalamus falsestea (Ponder, 1968)
 Amphithalamus fulcira (Laseron, 1956)
 Amphithalamus glabrus Simone, 1996
 Amphithalamus incidatus (Frauenfeld, 1867)
 Amphithalamus inclusus Carpenter, 1864
 Amphithalamus jacksoni (Brazier, 1895)
 Amphithalamus latisulcus (Ponder, 1968)
 Amphithalamus liratus Thiele, 1930
 Amphithalamus neglectus (Turton, 1932)
 Amphithalamus niger Rolán, 1991
 Amphithalamus obesus H. Adams, 1866
 Amphithalamus ornatus (Powell, 1927)
 Amphithalamus pyramis (Laseron, 1950)
 Amphithalamus rauli Rolán, 1991
 Amphithalamus semen (Odhner, 1924)
 Amphithalamus stephensae Bartsch, 1927
 Amphithalamus sundayensis Oliver, 1915
 Amphithalamus triangulus May, 1915
 Amphithalamus trosti Strong & Hertlein, 1939
 Amphithalamus vallei Aguayo & Jaume, 1947

References

 Powell, A.W.B. (1927). The genetic relationships of Australasian rissoids. Part 1. Descriptions of new recent genera and species from New Zealand and the Kermadec Islands. Transactions of the New Zealand Institute 57: 534-548.
 Laseron, C. F., 1950. Review of the Rissoidae of New South Wales. Records of the Australian Museum 22(3): 257–287
 Ponder, W. F. (1967). The classification of the Rissoidae and Orbitestellidae with descriptions of some new taxa. Transactions of the Royal Society of New Zealand, Zoology. 9(17): 193-224, pls 1-13.

External links
 Carpenter P.P. (1864). Supplementary report on the present state of our knowledge with regard to the Mollusca of the west coast of North America. Reports of the British Association for the Advancement of Science. 33 (for 1863): 517-686

Anabathridae
Gastropod genera